is a Formula One-based racing game developed by Nihon Bussan and published by Nichibutsu for the PC-Engine.

Reception
On release, Famicom Tsūshin scored the PC Engine version of the game a 31 out of 40.

References

External links 
 

1990 video games
Formula One video games
Japan-exclusive video games
Nihon Bussan games
Nintendo Entertainment System games
TurboGrafx-16 games
Video games developed in Japan

it:F1 Circus
ja:F1サーカス